Silao is a city and a notified area in Nalanda district in the Indian state of Bihar.  It is known for the excellent Khaja made by its Halwais. It is also the headquarters of a Block, a small administrative unit, by the same name.

Geography
It has an average elevation of 60 metres (196 feet).

Demographics
 India census, Silao had a population of 20,177. Males constitute 52% of the population and females 48%. Silao has an average literacy rate of 52%, lower than the national average of 59.5%: male literacy is 60%, and female literacy is 43%. In Silao, 19% of the population is under 6 years of ag

Economy
Banks

 Allahabad Bank
 Madhya Bihar Gramin Bank
 State Bank of India
 Punjab National Bank
 Sub Post Office
 Kisan market, silao
 Union Bank of India

References

See also

Cities and towns in Nalanda district